Shirinabad (also Romanized as Shīrīnābād) is a village in Jeyhun Dasht Rural District, Shara District, Hamadan County, Hamadan Province, Iran. At the 2006 census, its population was 708, in 145 families.

References 

Populated places in Hamadan County